Flower is an English surname and given name. Notable people with the name include:

Surname
Andy Flower (born 1968), British-Zimbabwean cricketer
Barnard Flower (died July or August 1517), Flemish glazier
Ernest Flower (1865–1926), British politician
Grant Flower (born 1970), Zimbabwean cricketer
Harry Flower (1900–1970), Australian rugby league footballer
Robert Flower (born 1955), Australian rules Footballer
Roswell P. Flower (1835–1899), American politician
William Henry Flower (1831–1899), British physician and naturalist
William Flower (martyr) (died 1555), English Protestant martyr

Given name
Flower Mocher (c. 1729–1801), British army officer
Flower Msuya (born 1959), Tanzanian psychologist
Flower A. Newhouse (1909–1994), American author

See also
 Flowers (name)
 Flora (surname)
 Flora (given name)
 Fleur (given name)
 Tzitzak, Khazar princess and Byzantine Empress whose name meant "flower"

Surnames
Given names
English-language surnames